Huzzah is an English exclamation.

Huzzah may also refer to:

 Huzzah, Missouri, an unincorporated community in Crawford County, Missouri
 Huzzah Creek (Meramec River), a stream in Missouri
 Huzzah Creek (St. Francis River), a stream in Missouri
 Huzzah, a character in Clive Barker's novel Imajica
 Huzzah Sound, a company founded by the Australian sound designer Andrew Plain